Damil Serena Dankerlui Wadilie (born 24 August 1996) is a professional footballer who plays as a right-back for Eredivisie club FC Groningen. Born in the Netherlands, he represents the Suriname national team.

Club career

Early career
Born and raised in Almere Haven to parents from Suriname, Dankerlui began his football career with local SV Almere before transferring to nearby FC Omniworld in 2005. In 2010, the club was then rebranded as Almere City FC, from where Dankerlui transferred to the youth ranks of partner club Ajax at the age of 16 two years later.

Ajax
While registered as part of the clubs' B1 selection (under-17 team), he made his professional debut in the Dutch Eerste Divisie on 22 October 2013, playing for the reserves team Jong Ajax as a 69th-minute substitute for Derwin Martina, in a 5–1 away loss against VVV-Venlo. The following season saw Dankerlui registered with the A1 selection (under-19 team), where he made his continental debut at youth level in the UEFA Youth League on 21 October 2014, in a 2–2 draw against Barcelona. Despite appearing on the bench for the first team of Ajax, he was never substituted on, plying his trade for the reserves team before leaving the club in January 2018.

Willem II
On 9 January 2018, it was announced that Dankerlui had transferred to Willem II, signing a two-year deal with the Eredivisie club from Tilburg.

Groningen
On 27 July 2020, Dankerlui joined fellow Eredivisie side Groningen on a four-year deal.

International career
On 15 October 2020, it was announced that Dankerlui had opted to represent the Suriname national team internationally. Although Suriname does not allow dual citizenship, the country have made an exception to issue special passports for athletes in the diaspora who want to represent Suriname as of 2019. Dankerlui became eligible to play for the national team as of 13 November 2020. He made his debut on 24 March 2021 in a World Cup qualifier against the Cayman Islands. Dankerlui was also subsequently called up in June 2021 to represent Suriname at the 2021 CONCACAF Gold Cup.

Career statistics

References

External links
 
 

1996 births
Living people
Dutch sportspeople of Surinamese descent
Footballers from Almere
Surinamese footballers
Dutch footballers
Association football fullbacks
Suriname international footballers
2021 CONCACAF Gold Cup players
Eredivisie players
Eerste Divisie players
AFC Ajax players
Jong Ajax players
Willem II (football club) players
FC Groningen players